The 1991 Vienna Cup took place in Vienna. Skaters competed in the disciplines of men's singles, ladies' singles, and ice dancing.

Results

Men

Ladies

Ice dancing

Sources
 Official Protocol of the competition

Karl Schäfer Memorial, 1991
Karl Schafer Memorial